Tayoltita is a town and seat of the municipality of San Dimas, in the state of Durango, north-western Mexico. As of 2010, the town had a total population of 5,124.

References

Populated places in Durango